William Wilson Fitts (June 16, 1915 – February 23, 2005) was an American professional basketball player. He played for the Akron Goodyear Wingfoots in the National Basketball League from 1937 to 1939. In his brief professional career, Cope averaged 2.0 points per game and contributed towards the Wingfoots' league championship in the 1937–38 season.

References

1915 births
2005 deaths
Akron Goodyear Wingfoots players
Akron Zips men's basketball players
American men's basketball players
Basketball players from Akron, Ohio
Forwards (basketball)
Guards (basketball)